ATUM is an American biotechnology company which provides tools for the life sciences, from design and synthesis of optimized DNA to protein production and GMP cell line development.

The company
ATUM (formerly DNA2.0) was founded in 2003, in Menlo Park, California. The company is privately held and continues to have all research, development and production in California, currently in their 50,000 sq ft Newark facility. It began and continues as a gene synthesis and protein engineering provider to academia, government and the pharmaceutical, chemical, agricultural and biotechnology industries. Gene Synthesis rapidly replaced molecular cloning for many academic and corporate labs, as "foundries for the biotechnology age" allowing made-to-order genes for biological research. 

DNA2.0 was featured on the PBS show Nova ScienceNow to show how genes are created synthetically in a lab. In 2008, the company supplied some of the DNA stretches used to create a synthetic bacterial genome. 

Dan Rather Reports included DNA2.0 in their episode on Synthetic Biology and how it is solving "some of the most important problems facing the world."

In 2009, The Scientist named the codon design algorithms (now trademarked as GeneGPS) developed by DNA2.0 as one of the Top 10 Innovations of the year for Life Sciences. ATUM developed the Electra Vector System, a universal cloning system that utilizes the type IIS restriction enzyme SapI and T4 DNA ligase in a single-tube reaction. ATUM has made some molecular components, such as synthetic fluorescent proteins, available in open-access collections of DNA parts (BioBricks Foundation). Atum is a founding member of the International Gene Synthesis Consortium (IGSC) to promote biosecurity in the gene-synthesis industry. There are over 1,200 published scientific articles using DNA2.0 products and/or services, of which 44 include company employees as an author(s).

Research tools
 Gene Designer is a free bioinformatics software package. It is used by molecular biologists to design, clone and validate genetic sequences.
 A free gRNA design tool with scoring algorithms for CRISPR.
 DNA ATLAS is a free plasmid mapping tool to show features such as promoters, markers, restriction sites and open reading frames in any DNA vector sequence.
 The online Bioinformatics toolbox was selected as a Best of the Web by Genetic Engineering News.

Partnerships
 The Perelman School of Medicine at the University of Pennsylvania will use the GeneGPS technology developed by ATUM primarily to support the Gene Therapy Program’s work on HIV-1 vaccine development by optimizing in vivo protein expression.
 The Infection and Immunity Research Centre at St. George’s, University of London and Atum partnered to develop plant-based pharmaceuticals.
 Adimab LLC. and ATUM employ an alliance in the area of antibody discovery and biomanufacturing via the design and construction of antibody libraries.
 Cytovance Biologics utilizes GeneGPS from ATUM as part of their Keystone Expression System for microbial strain development for successful biomanufacturing.
 Archer Daniels Midland Company applies ATUM's proprietary protein engineering technology, ProteinGPS, to ADM’s industrial enzyme engineering processes.
 ATUM is a sponsor of BioBuilder, a resource for hands-on activities and informative animations on synthetic biology for middle school and high school students and teachers; founded by Dr. Natalie Kuldell at MIT.

References

Research support companies
Biotechnology companies of the United States
Technology companies based in the San Francisco Bay Area
Companies based in Silicon Valley
Biotechnology companies established in 2003
2003 establishments in California